Eupariini is a tribe of aphodiine dung beetles in the family Scarabaeidae. There are about 12 genera and at least 80 described species in Eupariini.

Genera
These 30 genera belong to the tribe Eupariini:

 Annegialia Howden, 1971 i c g b
 Aphotaenius Cartwright, 1952 i c g b
 Arupaia Stebnicka, 1999 c g
 Ataenioides Petrovitz 1973
 Ataeniopsis Petrovitz, 1973 i c g b
 Ataenius Harold, 1867 i c g b
 Batesiana Chalumeau, 1983 c g
 Bruchaphodius Martinez, 1952 c g
 Cartwrightia Islas, 1959 c g
 Euparia LePeletier & Serville, 1828 i c g b
 Euparixia Brown, 1927 i c g b
 Euparixoides Hinton, 1936 c g
 Flechtmanniella Stebnicka, 1999 c g
 Haroldiataenius Chalumeau, 1981 i c g b
 Iarupea Martínez, 1953 c g
 Iguazua Stebnicka, 1997 c g
 Lomanoxia Martinez, 1951 c g
 Lomanoxoides Stebnicka 1999 c g
 Martineziana Chalumeau & Ozdikmen, 2006 i c g b
 Myrmecaphodius Martinez, 1952 c g
 Napoa Stebnicka, 1999 c g
 Odontolytes Koshantschikov, 1916 i c g b
 Oxyataenius Dellacasa & Stebnicka, 2001 c g
 Paraplesiataenius Chalumeau, 1992 c g
 Parataenius Balthasar, 1961 i c g b
 Passaliolla Balthasar, 1945 c g
 Pseudataenius Brown, 1927 i c g b
 Saprosites Redtenbacher, 1858 i c g
 Selviria Stebnicka, 1999 c g
 Tanyana Stebnicka, 2006 c g
Data sources: i = ITIS, c = Catalogue of Life, g = GBIF, b = Bugguide.net

References

Further reading

External links

 
 

Scarabaeidae
Articles created by Qbugbot